Zoë Dominic  (4 July 1920 – 11 January 2011) was a British dance and theatre photographer.

Dominic's work as a theatre photographer began in the Royal Court Theatre around 1957. She became known for photographing the postwar British theatre revival, including actors Laurence Olivier, Joan Plowright and Maggie Smith and performers Maria Callas, Margot Fonteyn and Rudolf Nureyev.

John Selwyn Gilbert wrote of her: "I know of no other photographer who got closer to the real spirit of dancers and the dance than Zoë Dominic. She was a remarkable photographer and inspired great trust in the artists she took as subjects. If she caught a dancer in an unflattering pose or making a mistake, a drooping wrist, a lazy, half-pointed foot, she would not print the picture."

She was awarded an OBE in 2006 and the Royal Photographic Society's Hood medal in 1986.

Publications
John Selwyn Gilbert and Zoë Dominic, Frederick Ashton: A Choreographer and His Ballets, Harrap (1971). .
Janet Baker and Zoë Dominic, Full Circle, an autobiographical Journal (1982). .

References

1920 births
2011 deaths
20th-century English women artists
20th-century women photographers
21st-century English women artists
21st-century women photographers
Alumni of the London Academy of Music and Dramatic Art
English women photographers
Officers of the Order of the British Empire
Photographers from London
Theatrical photographers